IRIS Distribution (Independent Recording Industry Services) - now The Orchard - is a digital music distribution and marketing firm based in San Francisco, CA and New York City. Co-founded by Matt Laszuk (CEO), Bryn Boughton (CMO) and Eric Ferraro (General Counsel) in 2003, IRIS distributes digital music, ringtones, and video to over 450 digital retailers in over 85 countries. It also promotes label catalogs through various outlets, including social networking sites, newsletters, and label profiles. The company offers its technical, marketing, and legal services to a wide range of independent artists and labels from all genres. Artists distributed by IRIS include She Wants Revenge, Le Tigre, Lou Reed, Mogwai, and many more.

History
After the launch of Apple's iTunes digital music store, IRIS Distribution was founded in 2003 to support independent labels in entering the digital marketplace. IRIS originally began as a co-op for independent artists, but quickly became a distribution company specializing in facilitating negotiations between retail services and independent labels.

IRIS Distribution's first digital distribution deals were with Force Inc. and Megaforce Records.

In 2007, IRIS expanded its services with the launch of BlinkerActive, a dedicated marketing arm devoted to music promotion and branded entertainment. Some of BlinkerActive's clients include Scion/Toyota, Ninja Tune, Chemikal Underground, Surfdog Records, BYO Records, and Mack Avenue Records among others.

IRIS reported strong growth and profitability in 2008.

Most recently, IRIS Distribution placed twice in The National Association of Record Industry Professionals’ poll, Best In The Biz (2009); IRIS placed second in the ‘Best Digital Distribution Company’ category, and Bryn Boughton as ‘Top New Media Representative.’

In May 2012 The Orchard, also a digital distributor, acquired IRIS Distribution. This consolidation came only two months after The Orchard had merged with IODA Distribution in March.

Labels Distributed by IRIS
This is not a complete list.

 +1 Music
 AGF Producktion
 Affluent Records
 Ant Zen / Salt
 Beta-lactam Ring Records
 Big Dada
 Chemikal Underground
 Coco Machete Records
 Duck Down Records
 Gemini Sun Records
 Hefty Records
 Hymen Records
 Konfort Records
 Kranky
 K Records
 Megaforce Records
 Minus Records
 Mutek
 Monolake Records
 Moodgadget Records
 Ninja Tune Records
 Palmetto Records
 Projekt Records
 Seed Records
 Static Discos Records
 Wednesday Records
 YouRelease Distribution

References

http://www.irisdistribution.com/press/Live365Podcast.pdf

http://www.prnewswire.com/news-releases/leading-independent-record-labels-select-iris-distribution-for-music-distribution-to-digital-retailers-75123127.html

External links
 IRIS Distribution
 BlinkerActive

Companies based in San Francisco
Companies established in 2003
American record labels
Digital audio distributors
Record labels established in 2003